The 2006–07 Albany Great Danes men's basketball team represented the University at Albany, SUNY in the 2006–07 NCAA Division I men's basketball season. The Great Danes, led by head coach Will Brown, played their home games at the SEFCU Arena in Albany, New York, as members of the America East Conference. After finishing 2nd in the conference regular season standings, the Great Danes won the America East tournament to earn an automatic bid to the NCAA tournament as the 13th seed in the South region. Albany was beaten by 4th seed Virginia in the first round, 84–57.

Roster 

Source

Schedule and results

|-
!colspan=12 style=|Regular season

|-
!colspan=12 style=| America East tournament

|-
!colspan=12 style=| NCAA tournament

Source

References

Albany Great Danes men's basketball seasons
Albany
Albany
Albany Great Danes men's basketball
Albany Great Danes men's basketball